Patna Law College is law institute in Patna, in the Indian state of Bihar. This is affiliated to the Patna University and courses were approved by the Bar Council of India of New Delhi.

History
Patna Law College was established in July 1909. Prior to the establishment of this Institution the teaching of Law used to be imparted in Patna College. Till 1917 the College was affiliated to Calcutta University. When Patna University came into existence in 1917, it became affiliated to it. Up to 1 January, 1952, Patna Law College was a Government institution and functioned as an independent unit. From that date it became a constituent college of Patna University under the Patna University Act. 1951.

References

External links 
 Patna Law College

Colleges affiliated to Patna University
Law schools in Bihar
Universities and colleges in Patna
1909 establishments in India
Educational institutions established in 1909